Birganj Inland Dry Port is Nepal's first dry port constructed in 2000 AD by Nepal Government. In 2001 AD. ownership of dryport transferred to NITDB. NITDB awarded HTPL the contract to operate and manage the Inland Clearance Depot in Sirsiya, Birganj. The dryport came in operation from 16 July 2004. The dryport covers an area of 38 hectares including customs office, four shed houses, terminal buildings, weighing bridges, two banks, six lines for train contgainer yard. 1586 containers can be managed at a time. The dryport is connected by Train owned by Indian Railways which connects the dryport to Raxaul in India.

Offices in Dryport
 Nepal Intermodal Transport Development Board (NITDB)
Custom Office - Dryport
Himalayan Terminal Pvt Ltd (Port Operator Company)
Intermodal Logistic 
Custom agent office
Nepal Police 

 Banks

 Kumari Bank Limited, Dryport Branch
 Everest Bank Limited, ICD Branch

See also

Nepal Intermodal Transport Development Board

References

Dry ports
Madhesh Province
Transport infrastructure in Nepal
2004 establishments in Nepal
Ports and harbours of Nepal